XHUNI-FM, known as Radio UAT, is a radio station in Ciudad Victoria, Tamaulipas, Mexico. It is the radio station of the Universidad Autónoma de Tamaulipas.

History
The UAT began producing radio programs in 1983, mostly being broadcast on other radio stations within the portion of their broadcast days reserved for the state. The first station, XHUNI-FM in Ciudad Victoria, came on air December 19, 1991, with its official opening two months later.

Programming
Programming on Radio UAT includes a mix of music and cultural programs, as well as programming aimed at the UAT community such as the newscast Enlace Universitario.

Former transmitters
From 1998 to 2019, Radio UAT maintained five low-power transmitters in other cities in Tamaulipas. A failure to file a timely renewal led to their deletion in 2015; the stations continued operating for several more years.

References

Radio stations in Ciudad Victoria
Radio stations in Ciudad Mante
Radio stations in Tampico
Radio stations in Nuevo Laredo
Radio stations in Laredo, Texas
Radio stations in Matamoros, Tamaulipas
Radio stations in Reynosa
University radio stations in Mexico